Raymond Matthew Neufeld (born April 15, 1959) is a Canadian former professional ice hockey right winger originally from Winkler, Manitoba. He is currently working in the oil industry, but remains closely associated with minor and junior hockey as a scout in Alberta, Saskatchewan and Manitoba.  Formerly, Neufeld was a radio commentator with TSN 1290 on Winnipeg Jets hockey broadcasts, and was assistant coach and the assistant general manager of the Winnipeg Blues of the Manitoba Junior Hockey League.

Playing career
Neufeld's career started with the Hartford Whalers, before he was traded to the Winnipeg Jets for Dave Babych on November 21, 1985. He was traded to the Boston Bruins for Moe Lemay on December 30, 1988, where he finished his career two years later.

Career statistics

References

External links
 
 Ray Neufeld's profile at Hockey Draft Central

1959 births
Living people
Binghamton Whalers players
Black Canadian ice hockey players
Boston Bruins players
Canadian ice hockey right wingers
Edmonton Oil Kings (WCHL) players
Flin Flon Bombers players
Hartford Whalers draft picks
Hartford Whalers players
Ice hockey people from Winnipeg
Canadian Mennonites
Maine Mariners players
People from Saint Boniface, Winnipeg
People from Winkler, Manitoba
Springfield Indians players
Winnipeg Jets (1979–1996) players